Weert is a municipality and city in the southeastern Netherlands located in the western part of the province of Limburg. It lies on the Eindhoven–Maastricht railway line, and is also astride the Zuid-Willemsvaart canal.

Population centres

The city of Weert 
Weert received city rights in 1414.

Weert is known for its indoor shopping centre called "De Munt," one of the largest in the south of the Netherlands. The inner city has many squares with cosy restaurants and terraces. Many well-known shopping brands are located in the city of Weert.

Furthermore, Weert is known for its large indoor and outdoor swimming complex known as "De IJzerenman," which includes slides, 5 swimming pools, and a lake.

Demographics

Languages
 Dutch in Weert is often spoken with a distinctive Limburgish accent, which should not be confused with the Limburgish language.
 Limburgish (or Limburgian) is the overlapping term of dialects spoken in the Belgian and Dutch provinces of Limburg. The Weert dialect is only one of many variants of Limburgish.

Transport 
Railway station: Weert

Notable residents
 Willem van Heythuysen (1590s – 1650), cloth merchant
 Jan van der Croon (1600 – 1665), soldier and military commander
 Jan Dibbets (born 1941), conceptual artist
 Jan Koenderink (born 1943) physicist and psychologist
 Ton van Loon (born 1956), military commander
 Lucas Hüsgen (born 1960), writer
 Frans Weekers (born 1967), Dutch Politician
 Jeroen Lenaers (born 1984) Dutch politician and Member of the European Parliament 
 Kelly Weekers (born 1989) Miss Nederland 2011

Sport 
 Fons Steuten (1938–1991), cyclist
 Gonnelien Rothenberger (born 1968), equestrian
 Sjeng Schalken (born 1976), tennis player
 Manoe Meulen (born 1978), footballer
 Elbekay Bouchiba (born 1978), footballer
 Frank van Kouwen (born 1980), footballer
 Bjorn Hoeben (born 1980), cyclist
 Olivier Tielemans (born 1984), race car driver
 Pieter Custers (born 1984), archer
 Steef Nieuwendaal (born 1986), footballer
 Lisa Scheenaard (born 1988), rower

Sister cities
Weert is twinned with the following cities:

Gallery

References

External links 

  

 
Cities in the Netherlands
Municipalities of Limburg (Netherlands)
Populated places in Limburg (Netherlands)